

Siblings

Brothers
Alexander Alekhine and Alexei Alekhine
Dávid Bérczes and Csaba Bérczes
Jacobo Bolbochán and Julio Bolbochán
Olexandr Bortnyk and Mykola Bortnyk
Donald Byrne and Robert Byrne
Andrey Drygalov and Sergey Drygalov
Hans Duhm, Dietrich Duhm and Andreas Duhm
Arnold van Foreest and Dirk van Foreest
Jorden van Foreest and Lucas van Foreest
Daniel Fridman and Rafael Fridman
Celso Golmayo Torriente and Manuel Golmayo Torriente
Mirosław Grabarczyk and Bogdan Grabarczyk
Karen Grigorian and Levon Grigorian
Jozsef Horvath and Csaba Horváth
Baadur Jobava and Beglar Jobava
Paul Johner and Hans Johner
Arvid Kubbel and Leonid Kubbel
Emanuel Lasker and Berthold Lasker
Gustave Lazard and Frédéric Lazard
Kjetil Aleksander Lie and Espen Lie
John Littlewood and Norman Littlewood
Athanasios Mastrovasilis and Dimitrios Mastrovasilis
Nelson Mariano II and Nelson Mariano III
Yoav Milikow and Elie Milikow
Nicholas Pert and Richard Pert
Lajos Portisch and Ferenc Portisch
Alexander Romanovsky and Peter Romanovsky
Kevin Spraggett and Grant Spraggett
Endre Steiner and Lajos Steiner
Rasmus Svane and Frederik Svane
Jan Timman and Ton Timman
František Treybal and Karel Treybal
Yuri Vovk and Andrey Vovk
Andrey Zhigalko and Sergei Zhigalko

Sisters
Sabina Francesca Foisor and Mihaela-Veronica Foisor
Elvira Berend and Gulnar Sachs
Anita Gara and Ticia Gara
Vasanti Khadilkar, Jayshree Khadilkar and Rohini Khadilkar 
Nadezhda Kosintseva and Tatiana Kosintseva
Alexandra Kosteniuk and Oxana Kosteniuk
Alisa Marić and Mirjana Marić
Vera Menchik and Olga Menchik
Anna Muzychuk and Mariya Muzychuk
Mai Narva and Triin Narva
Gülümser Öney and Gülsevil Yılmaz
Živilė Šarakauskienė and Dagnė Čiukšytė
Vilma Paulauskienė and Renata Turauskienė
Susan Polgar, Sofia Polgar and Judit Polgár
Benita Vēja and Tamāra Vilerte
Shrook Wafa and Shahenda Wafa

Brother and sister
Jorge Cori and Deysi Cori
Dan Cramling and Pia Cramling
Paweł Czarnota and Dorota Kika
Adam Hunt and Harriet Hunt
Shahriyar Mammadyarov, Zeinab Mamedyarova and Turkan Mamedyarova
Nelson Mariano II and Cristine Rose Mariano
Greg Shahade and Jennifer Shahade
Levente Vajda and Szidonia Vajda
Turhan Yılmaz, Gülümser Öney and Gülsevil Yılmaz
Stanisław Zawadzki and Jolanta Zawadzka
Jorden van Foreest, Lucas van Foreest and Machteld van Foreest
Jovanka Houska and Miroslav Houska
Vaishali Rameshbabu and Praggnanandhaa Rameshbabu
Tomasz Warakomski and Anna Warakomska

Parent and child

Father and son
Peter Biyiasas and Theodore Biyiasas
Vladimir Eljanov and Pavel Eljanov
Celso Golmayo Zúpide and Celso Golmayo Torriente
Sergiu Henric Grünberg and Mihai-Lucian Grünberg
Wolfgang Heidenfeld and Mark Heidenfeld
Dmitry Kayumov and Sergey Kayumov
Larry Kaufman and Raymond Kaufman
Bogdan Lalic and Peter Lalic
John Littlewood and Paul Littlewood
Cecil Purdy and John Purdy
Mike Shahade and Gregory Shahade
Sam Sloan and Peter Aravena Sloan
Vladimir Smirnov and Anton Smirnov
Vasily Osipovich Smyslov and Vasily Smyslov
Evgeny Sveshnikov and Vladimir Sveshnikov
Milan Vidmar and Milan Vidmar Jr.
Mikhail Yudovich and Mikhail Yudovich Jr.
Viacheslav Zakhartsov and Vladimir Zakhartsov
Anatoly Donchenko and Alexander Donchenko
Tahir Vakhidov and Jahongir Vakhidov

Father and daughter
Evgeny Agrest and Inna Agrest
Sergey Belavenets and Liudmila Belavenets
Ovidiu Doru Foisor and Sabina Francesca Foisor
Baruch Harold Wood and Peggy Clarke
Thomas Pähtz and Elisabeth Pähtz
Mike Shahade and Jennifer Shahade
Sam Sloan and Julia Elizabeth Sloan
Viacheslav Stjazhkin and Anna Styazhkina
Yuri Goryachkin and Aleksandra Goryachkina
Juan Manuel Bellón López and Anna Cramling Bellón

Mother and daughter
Naira Agababean and Almira Skripchenko
Svetlana Agrest and Inna Agrest
Maria Albuleț and Marina Makropoulou
Pia Cramling and Anna Cramling Bellón
Cristina Adela Foișor and Sabina Francesca Foisor, Mihaela-Veronica Foisor
Nonna Karakashyan and Narine Karakashian
Regina Narva and Mai Narva, Triin Narva
Olga Rubtsova and Elena Fatalibekova
Olga Stjazhkina and Anna Styazhkina

Mother and son
Jovanka Velimirović and Dragoljub Velimirović

Grandfather and grandson
Spencer Crakanthorp and John Purdy

Husband and wife
Evgeny Agrest and Svetlana Agrest
Alexander Alekhine and Grace Alekhine
Mohammed Al-Modiahki and Zhu Chen
Keith Arkell and Susan Arkell
Sergey Arkhipov and Natalia Alekhina
Levon Aronian and Arianne Caoili
Suat Atalık and Ekaterina Atalik
Algirdas Bandza and Rasa Bandzienė
Mateusz Bartel and Marta Bartel
Robert Bellin and Jana Bellin
Juan Manuel Bellón López and Pia Cramling
István Bilek and Edit Bilek
Peter Biyiasas and Ruth Haring
Milko Bobotsov and Antonia Ivanova
Igor Bondarevsky and Valentina Kozlovskaya
Bu Xiangzhi and Huang Qian
Graeme Buckley and Susan Arkell-Lalic
Pascal Charbonneau and Irina Krush
Egor Chukaev and Klavdiya Chukaeva
William John Donaldson and Elena Donaldson-Akhmilovskaya
Pavel Eljanov and Olena Dvoretska
Lūcijs Endzelīns and Milda Lauberte
Vladimir Feldman and Irina Berezina
Alexandr Fier and Nino Maisuradze
Bobby Fischer and Miyoko Watai
Glenn Flear and Christine Flear
Ovidiu Doru Foisor and Cristina Adela Foișor
Robert Fontaine and Kateryna Lahno
Laurent Fressinet and Almira Skripchenko
Daniel Fridman and Anna Zatonskih
Grzegorz Gajewski and Joanna Majdan-Gajewska
Valeriya Gansvind and Sergey Kalinitschew
Petar Genov and Lyubka Genova
Anish Giri and Sopiko Guramishvili
Alexander Grischuk and Natalia Zhukova
Boris Gulko and Anna Akhsharumova
Aidyn Guseinov and Elmira Alieva
Zoltan Gyimesi and Nóra Medvegy
Hichem Hamdouchi and Adina-Maria Hamdouchi
William Hartston and Jana Hartston
Helgi Grétarsson and Lenka Ptáčníková
Sergey Grigoriants and Petra Papp
Gilberto Hernández Guerrero and Claudia Amura
Miguel Illescas and Olga Alexandrova
Alexander Ivanov and Esther Epstein
Artur Jakubiec and Edyta Jakubiec
Paweł Jaracz and Barbara Jaracz
Sriram Jha and Subbaraman Vijayalakshmi
Gawain Jones and Sue Maroroa
Toms Kantans and Anna Kantane
Sergey Karjakin and Kateryna Dolzhykova
Andrei Kharlov and Elena Zaiatz
Jānis Klovāns and Astra Klovāne
Jānis Kļaviņš and Ilga Kļaviņa
Oleg Korneev and Tatiana Kononenko
Yona Kosashvili and Sofia Polgar
Leonid Kritz and Nadezhda Kosintseva
Erwin l'Ami and Alina l'Ami
Bogdan Lalić and Susan Lalic
Gary Lane and Nancy Lane
Vladimir Lazarev and Anda Šafranska
Christopher Lutz and Anke Lutz
Igor Lysyj and Olga Girya
Marat Makarov and Julia Demina
Vadim Malakhatko and Anna Zozulia
Vidmantas Mališauskas and Marina Mališauskienė
Rauf Mamedov and Nataliya Buksa
Robert Markuš and Ana Srebrnič
Reginald Pryce Michell and Edith Michell
Igor Miladinović and Anna-Maria Botsari
Tony Miles and Jana Miles
Sergei Movsesian and Petra Krupková
Martin Mrva and Alena Mrvová
Arkadij Naiditsch and Yuliya Shvayger
Jaan Narva and Regina Narva
Nguyễn Ngọc Trường Sơn and Phạm Lê Thảo Nguyên
Peter Heine Nielsen and Viktorija Čmilytė
Srećko Nedeljković and Verica Nedeljković
John Nunn and Petra Fink
Suat Rıza Öney and Gülümser Öney
Arman Pashikian and Maria Kursova
Peng Xiaomin and Qin Kanying
Jovan Petronic and Sanja Petronic
Vasik Rajlich and Iweta Rajlich
Ramachandran Ramesh and Aarthie Ramaswamy
Igors Rausis and Olita Rause
Zoltán Ribli and Maria Grosch
Maxim Rodshtein and Tereza Olsarova
Ian Rogers and Cathy Rogers
Vidrik Rootare and Salme Rootare
Gennadij Sagalchik and Olga Sagalchik
Bjarke Sahl and Sheila Barth Berntsen
Gediminas Sarakauskas and Zivile Sarakauskiene
Yasser Seirawan and Yvette Nagel
Miron Sher and Alla Grinfeld
Alexei Shirov and Viktorija Čmilytė
Alexei Shirov and Olga Dolgova
Alexei Shirov and Anastasia Travkina
Yuri Shulman and Viktorija Ni
Luca Shytaj and Elisabeth Pähtz
Bartosz Soćko and Monika Soćko
Alexey Suetin and Kira Zvorykina
Praveen Thipsay and Bhagyashree Thipsay
Pavel Tregubov and Alexandra Kosteniuk
Paul Truong and Susan Polgar
Maxim Turov and Irina Slavina Turova
Dennis Wagner and Dinara Wagner
Radosław Wojtaszek and Alina Kashlinskaya
Wu Shaobin and Xie Jun
Wu Xibin and Lou Hongyu
Alex Yermolinsky and Camilla Baginskaite
Stanisław Zawadzki and Beata Zawadzka
Zhang Zhong and Li Ruofan
Georg Meier and Inna Agrest
Alexander Grischuk and Kateryna Lagno
Matthieu Cornette and Daulyte Deimante
Jan Werle and Iozefina Paulet
Nijat Abasov and Khayala Abdulla
Misratdin Iskandarov and Narmin Kazimova
Twan Burg and Nargiz Umudova

References

ChessBase.com - Chess News - Kateryna and Robert – pour la vie à jamais unis...

External links
Relatives and Spouses of Chess Masters by Bill Wall
Chess players and their spouses by Bill Wall
Strongest Chess Couples by Natalia Pogonina

Chess
Families